This is a list of notable footballers who have played for Dagenham & Redbridge F.C. Generally, this means players that have played a significant amount of first-class matches for the club. Other players who have played an important role for the club can be included, but the reason why they have been included should be added in the 'Notes' column.

For a list of all Dag & Red players, major or minor, with a Wikipedia article, see Category:Dagenham & Redbridge players, and for the current squad see the main Dag & Red article.

Players are listed according to the date of their first team debut. Appearances and goals are for first-team competitive matches only; wartime matches are excluded. Substitute appearances included.

Key
The following list contains only players who played in the Football League whilst a registered player of Dagenham & Redbridge. Appearances gained prior to joining and subsequent to leaving the club and non-league games are not included.
Table headings: Apps = Total number of league appearances for Dagenham & Redbridge; Goals = Total number of league goals for Dagenham & Redbridge; Years = Dates spent registered as a Dagenham & Redbridge player whilst in the Football League; Ref = source of information   
Playing positions: GK = Goalkeeper; DF = Defender; MF = Midfielder; FW = Forward
 * Players with this colour and symbol in the "Name" column are currently signed to Dagenham & Redbridge.
  Players with this colour and symbol in the "Nation" column are capped at full international level.
 Players with name in italics and marked  were on loan were on loan from another club for the duration of their Dagenham & Redrbidge career.
 Players marked in bold with the  symbol have won the Dagenham & Redbridge Player of the Year award.

List of players

References 

Dagenham and Redbridge
Players
Association football player non-biographical articles